The Bais–Kabankalan Road or Kabankalan–Bais Road is a two-to-four lane  major road that connects the municipality of Manjuyod in Negros Oriental to the city of Kabankalan in Negros Occidental. It contains four lanes highway on Bais--Kabankalan road in the whole of Kabankalan City.

The road forms part of National Route 6 (N6) of the Philippine highway network.

Intersections

References 

Roads in Negros Occidental
Roads in Negros Oriental